Peso in My Pocket is the nineteenth studio album by American country music artist Toby Keith. It was released on October 15, 2021 by Show Dog-Universal Music.

Content
The album is Keith's first studio album since 35 MPH Town in 2015. He began writing for the album at a house he owns in Cabo San Lucas, Mexico during the COVID-19 pandemic. After receiving calls for new music from "radio honchos", he decided to compile a new album. The album's lead single is "Old School", co-written by country singer Maren Morris and her husband, Ryan Hurd.

Critical reception
The album received four out of five stars from AllMusic, whose reviewer Stephen Thomas Erlewine wrote that "Lively, funny, and brawny in a way he hasn't been since his hot streak in the 2000s, Peso in My Pocket is filled with songs so lean that it takes a moment to realize that Keith covers a lot of musical ground here."

Track listing

Personnel 
Adapted from liner notes.

Roy Agee - trombone (tracks 4, 7)
Greg Barnhill - background vocals (tracks 1, 7, 8)
Jimmy Carter - bass guitar (tracks 3, 6)
Vinnie Ciesielski - trumpet (track 7)
Evan Cobb - baritone saxophone (track 7), tenor saxophone (track 7)
Perry Coleman - background vocals (tracks 3, 5, 6, 9)
Joanna Cotten - background vocals (track 10)
Chad Cromwell - drums (tracks 1, 4, 8, 10)
Kris Donegan - acoustic guitar (track 6), electric guitar (track 6)
Dan Dugmore - steel guitar (all tracks except 3 & 6)
Fred Eltringham - drums (tracks 2, 5, 7), percussion (track 4)
LaShanda Evans - background vocals (track 4)
Tim Galloway - acoustic guitar (tracks 4, 10)
Kenny Greenberg - acoustic guitar (tracks 2, 8-10), electric guitar (all tracks except 2 & 8)
Tania Hancheroff - background vocals (tracks 1, 3, 4)
Mike Hosty - slide guitar (track 1)
David Huff - programming (track 6)
Terrell Hunt - background vocals (track 4)
Evan Hutchings - drums (tracks 3, 6), programming (track 3)
Toby Keith - lead vocals (all tracks)
Mills Logan - background vocals (track 2)
Pat McGrath - acoustic guitar (track 5)
Rob McNelley - acoustic guitar (track 7), electric guitar (tracks 1, 2, 4, 7-10)
Jamie McLaughlin - programming (track 1)
Keb' Mo' - resonator guitar (track 4)
Michael Rhodes - bass guitar (all tracks except 3 & 6)
Mike Rojas - accordion (track 8), B-3 organ (track 7), keyboards (track 3), piano (all tracks except 3)
Justin Schipper - steel guitar (tracks 3, 6)
Brett Tyler - acoustic guitar (track 3)

Chart performance

References

2021 albums
Toby Keith albums
Show Dog-Universal Music albums
Albums produced by Kenny Greenberg
Albums produced by Toby Keith